Albert Andrew Daly (29 January 1900 – 11 April 1976) was an Australian rules footballer who played for the South Melbourne Football Club in the Victorian Football League (VFL).

Notes

External links 

1900 births
1976 deaths
Australian rules footballers from Melbourne
Sydney Swans players
People from West Melbourne, Victoria